The Pine Bowl (パインボウル) is an annual college football bowl game played in Japan. The game features the champions of the Hokkaido American Football Association and the Tohoku Collegiate American Football Association. The winner claims the title of North Japan champions and goes on to play the Kanto League champion in the East Japan Championship.

Game results

References

External links
  (Japanese)

American football in Japan
American football leagues
College football bowls
Sport in Hokkaido
Hokkaido American Football Association
 
Annual sporting events in Japan
1986 establishments in Japan
Recurring sporting events established in 1986